Harold Roy "Hal" Hanton (25 May 1922 – 14 September 2011) was a former Australian rules footballer who played with Carlton in the Victorian Football League (VFL).

Family
The son of William Mark Hanton (1878-1956), and Ellen Clement Hanton (1883-1962), née Annand, Harold Roy Hanton was born at Frankston, Victoria on 25 May 1922.

His twin brother, Alexander George "Alex" Hanton (1922-2011), also played for Carlton in the VFL.

Harold married Jean Cecile Ogle on 26 May 1951.

Death
He died on 14 September 2011, just 9 days after Alex's death.

Notes

References
 
 Connolly, Rohan, "Twins who signalled one of Carlton's great eras",The Age, Sunday, 24 April 2011.
 World War Two Nominal Roll: Lance Corporal Harold Roy Hanton (VX88795/V310318), Department of Veterans' Affairs.
 B883, VX88795: World War Two Service Record: Lance Corporal Harold Roy Hanton (VX88795/V310318), National Archives of Australia.

External links 
 
 Hal Hanton's profile at Blueseum

1922 births
2011 deaths
Carlton Football Club players
Australian rules footballers from Melbourne
Australian twins
Twin sportspeople
People from Frankston, Victoria